Selma Blažeková (born 2 March 1991) is a Slovak handball player for HK Slávia Partizánske and the Slovak national team.

References

1991 births
Living people
Slovak female handball players